POM Wonderful Presents: The Greatest Movie Ever Sold is a 2011 documentary film about product placement, marketing and advertising directed by Morgan Spurlock. The premise behind the production is that the documentary itself would be entirely paid for by sponsors, thus being a form of metafilm. The film's slogan is "He's not selling out, he's buying in."

People appearing in the film
Besides a great number of sponsoring and non-sponsoring corporate figures appearing in the film, others include:

J. J. Abrams, filmmaker
Peter Bemis of Bemis/Balkind
Peter Berg, filmmaker
Big Boi from Outkast
Noam Chomsky, Professor Emeritus of Linguistics at Massachusetts Institute of Technology
Bob Garfield, co-host on On the Media
Sut Jhally, Professor of Communication, University of Massachusetts Amherst
Britt Johnson of mediaplacement
Matt Johnson and Kim Schifino of Matt & Kim
Beth Jones, Ban Brand Manager at Kao Brands Company
Gilberto Kassab, mayor of São Paulo, Brazil
Jimmy Kimmel and a "live" show of Jimmy Kimmel Live!
Richard Kirshenbaum of Kirshenbaum Bond Senecal + Partners
Jon Bond of Kirshenbaum Bond Senecal + Partners
Damian Kulash of OK Go
Rick Kurnit, a lawyer specializing in advertising law
Michael Levine of Levine Communications Office, Inc.
Martin Lindstrom of Buyology Inc.
Susan Linn, Author of Consuming Kids
Mark Crispin Miller
Regina Monteiro, Director of Urban Planning, City of São Paulo, Brazil
Ralph Nader, consumer advocate
Brett Ratner, film director and producer
L.A. Reid, music producer formerly of Island Def Jam Music
Lynda Resnick, owner and chief executive officer of POM Wonderful
Tony Seiniger of Seiniger Advertising
Stan Sheetz of Sheetz, Inc
Ben Silverman of Electus and formerly of NBC Entertainment
Brian Steinberg, TV Editor of Advertising Age
Quentin Tarantino, screenwriter/director
Donald Trump
Matt Tupper of POM Wonderful
David Art Wales of Ministry of Culture marketing consultancy
Robert Weissman of Public Citizen
Faris Yakob of kbs+p
Lindsay Zaltman of Olson Zaltman Associates

Release
The film premiered at the Sundance Film Festival in January 2011. In the United States, the film had a limited release, opening on April 22, 2011 in
New York City, Los Angeles, San Francisco, Chicago, Washington D.C., Boston,  Philadelphia, San Diego, Phoenix, and Austin, Texas.  The film opened the 2011 Hot Docs Canadian International Documentary Festival on April 28, 2011.

Sponsors
Spurlock signed non-disparagement clauses with most of the companies showcased in his film but retained final cut.  POM Wonderful agreed to pay one million dollars for above-the-title billing  ("POM Wonderful Presents"), though the full amount was contingent on the film grossing $10 million at the box office, selling a half-million downloads and DVDs, and generating 600 million media impressions.  As of 26 August 2011, the film had an estimated gross of approximately US$638,476.

Mane 'n Tail is featured prominently in the film, but the film's end titles disclose that they did not pay for the promotion. Instead, Mane 'n Tail provided free products to be used in the production of the film. Many other brands only provided products or contributed to the promotion of the movie.

For 60 days, beginning April 27, 2011, the city of Altoona, Pennsylvania (home of Sheetz, one of the movie's major sponsors) officially changed its name to "POM Wonderful Presents: The Greatest Movie Ever Sold, Pennsylvania" to help Spurlock promote the film, and received $25,000 for doing so.

Other sponsors include:
 
 Amy's Kitchen
 The Aruba Tourism Authority
 Ban
 Carrera Sunglasses
 Get It For Free Online
 Hyatt
 JetBlue
 KDF Car Wraps
 Merrell
 Mini
 Solstice Sunglass Boutique
 Trident
 Carmex
 MovieTickets.com
 Old Navy
 Ted Baker
 Petland Discounts
 Seventh Generation Inc.
 Sheetz
 Thayers

Music

Spurlock used Brooklyn dance-punk duo Matt and Kim's music as the movie soundtrack and their song "Cameras" from the album Sidewalks for the opening credits. Band members Matt Johnson and Kim Schifino are also interviewed in the film.

The film's theme song is called "The Greatest Song I Ever Heard" by the rock band OK Go. The song was made available for download on 1 April 2011. OK Go performed the song at the film's premiere and at promotions for the film. They also appeared live on The Late Late Show with Craig Ferguson performing the song.

A soundtrack album was released to digital music stores on April 26, 2011, and on CD August 23, 2011.

Reception
The film received 73% positive reviews from film critics on the review aggregate website Rotten Tomatoes, with an average rating of 6.3 out of 10. On Metacritic, the film received a score of 66 out of 100.

Stephen Holden called the film "even more amusing than Super Size Me", pointing out that "more than once the movie shows Mr. Spurlock, armed with clever storyboards, selling his ideas with an enthusiasm and skill that would put Don Draper of Mad Men to shame."

References

External links
 
 
 
 
 MorganSpurlock.com

Sony Pictures Classics films
2011 films
2011 documentary films
2011 independent films
American documentary films
Films directed by Morgan Spurlock
American independent films
Self-reflexive films
Documentary films about the film industry
Documentary films about advertising
Stage 6 Films films
Films produced by Keith Calder
2010s English-language films
2010s American films